Eric Charles Findon (2 March 1913 – 25 August 1941) was a male English international table tennis player and actor.

Table tennis career
He was selected to represent England during the 1934 World Table Tennis Championships in the Swaythling Cup. The other team members were Don Foulis, Herbert 'Willie' Hales, Ken Hyde and Andrew Millar and they finished in seventh place.

The Spalding 'Eric Findon Autograph' table tennis bat was named after him. He was the owner and editor of 'The Table Tennis World' magazine in 1931.

Acting career
He appeared as a teenager in two feature films called The Rising Generation (1928) and Cupid in Clover (1929).

Death
He was killed in action during World War II in Wavre, Walloon Brabant, serving with the 78 Squadron, Royal Air Force Volunteer Reserve.

See also
 List of England players at the World Team Table Tennis Championships

References

English male table tennis players
1913 births
1941 deaths
Royal Air Force Volunteer Reserve personnel of World War II
Royal Air Force personnel killed in World War II
Royal Air Force airmen